David Dirk Hoppen (born March 13, 1964) is an American former professional basketball player who played in the National Basketball Association (NBA) and other leagues. Hoppen played college basketball for the Nebraska Cornhuskers, and is the program's all-time leading scorer. He was named All-Big Eight in each of his last three seasons and is generally considered one of the top players in school history. A 6'11" center, Hoppen was selected by the Atlanta Hawks in the third round (65th pick overall) of the 1986 NBA draft and played six NBA seasons.

High school career
Born and raised in Omaha, Nebraska, Hoppen attended Omaha Benson High School where he was a multi-sport athlete for the "Bunnies."

As a junior, Hoppen led the Bunnies to a 21–4 record, averaging 15.8 points and 13.2 rebounds per game and was named first-team all-state. In the postseason, he led Benson to an exciting  Nebraska Class A state finals. In the semifinal, the Bunnies outlasted Lincoln High School 64–62 in double-overtime. This landed the team in the state final, where they lost a hotly contested game to Creighton Prep, 54–53. Hoppen was named to both the class A and all-class tournament teams. In his senior season, Hoppen was again named first-team all-state after averaging 24.3 points and 12.5 rebounds per game.

The Nebraska high school class of 1982 is generally considered one of the best in state history, as the entire starting five accepted NCAA Division I scholarship offers – Hoppen and Mike Martz to the University of Nebraska, Kerry Trotter to Marquette, Ron Kellogg to Kansas and Bill Jackman became one of Duke coach Mike Krzyzewski's first recruits (though he later transferred to join Hoppen and Martz with the Cornhuskers). The team was so strong that future NBA player Bart Kofoed was relegated to the second team. On the national AAU circuit, these players formed the nucleus of the "Nebraska Basketball Development Association" team that was strong enough to finish fourth at a Las Vegas tournament. Hoppen's personal legacy as one of the top high school players in state history is shown in his presence on the Omaha World-Herald's 2005 list of the top 100 Nebraska athletes and his 1998 induction into the Nebraska High School Sports Hall of Fame.

Hoppen was highly recruited, with his finalist list consisting of Nebraska, Notre Dame, Kentucky, Missouri, Kansas and Colorado. He ultimately narrowed this down to a decision between Nebraska and Notre Dame. Notre Dame coach Digger Phelps focused his recruiting pitch on his ability to help Hoppen become a first round NBA draft choice, but the Omaha center ultimately chose Nebraska as a school where he could help establish a tradition.

College career
Hoppen arrived at the University of Nebraska–Lincoln in the Fall of 1982. The 6'11" center was a particularly highly anticipated recruit as the Cornhuskers had gone 16–12 the previous season with no starter taller than 6'6. He immediately entered the starting lineup for coach Moe Iba's 1982–83 team, averaging 13.9 points and 5 rebounds per game. The Huskers experienced team success with their new inside presence, finishing tied for third in the Big Eight Conference and earning a bid to the 1983 National Invitation Tournament (NIT). Once there, the Huskers defeated Tulane, Iona and TCU to earn a spot in the tournament final four at Madison Square Garden in New York City. However, the team lost their semifinal matchup to Ray Meyer's DePaul team, despite Hoppen scoring 15 points.

As a sophomore, Hoppen became one of the top players in the Big Eight Conference. He was one of only two players in the league (with Oklahoma's Wayman Tisdale) to score double-figures in each of his team's games, and was named first-team all-conference. He averaged 19.9 points and 6.9 rebounds per game, again leading the Cornhuskers to the 1984 NIT. There, Hoppen propelled the Cornhuskers past in-state rival Creighton in the first round by scoring a game-high 25 points, including a basket and a technical free throw in the final seconds to seal the 56–54 victory. In the next round, Nebraska lost a close 58–57 contest to Xavier in Cincinnati, despite Hoppen's game-high 22 points.

Hoppen enjoyed a college rivalry with Creighton center and future NBA player Benoit Benjamin. While McDonald's All-American Benjamin was a much bigger name in national recruiting scene, Hoppen had some of his best games in match-ups against the Omaha school. Though a big man, Hoppen was known as a finesse player with a deft shooting touch. He employed a jump hook and a variety of other offensive weapons in the paint.

Career statistics

NBA

Regular season

|-
| style="text-align:left;"| 1987–88
| style="text-align:left;"| Milwaukee
| 3|| 0|| 11.7 || .364 || .000 || 1.000 || 2.3 || 0.7 || 0.0 || 0.0 || 3.7
|-
| style="text-align:left;"| 1987–88
| style="text-align:left;"| Golden State
| 36|| 8|| 16.9 || .465 || .000 || .864 || 4.6 || 0.8 || 0.4 || 0.2 || 5.9
|-
| style="text-align:left;"| 1988–89
| style="text-align:left;"| Charlotte
| 77|| 36|| 18.4 || .564 || .500 || .727 || 5.0 || 0.7 || 0.3 || 0.3 || 6.5
|-
| style="text-align:left;"| 1989–90
| style="text-align:left;"| Charlotte
| 10|| 2|| 13.5 || .390 || .000 || .800 || 3.6 || 0.6 || 0.2 || 0.1 || 4.0
|-
| style="text-align:left;"| 1990–91
| style="text-align:left;"| Charlotte
| 19|| 0|| 5.9 || .563|| .000 || .800 || 1.6 || 0.2 || 0.1 || 0.1 || 2.3
|-
| style="text-align:left;"| 1990–91
| style="text-align:left;"| Philadelphia
| 11|| 0|| 3.9 || .500 || .000 || .667 || 0.8 || 0.0 || 0.1 || 0.0 || 1.8
|-
| style="text-align:left;"| 1991–92
| style="text-align:left;"| Philadelphia
| 11|| 0|| 3.6 || .286 || .000 || .500 || 0.9 || 0.2 || 0.0 || 0.0 || 0.8
|-
| style="text-align:left;"| 1992–93
| style="text-align:left;"| New Jersey
| 2|| 0|| 5.0 || 1.000 || .000 || .000 || 2.0 || 0.0 || 0.0 || 0.0 || 1.0
|-
|-class="sortbottom"
| style="text-align:left;"| Career
| style="text-align:left;"|
| 169|| 46|| 14.2 || .518 || .200 || .751|| 3.8|| 0.6 || 0.3 || 0.2 || 5.0

Playoffs

|-
| style="text-align:left;"| 1991
| style="text-align:left;"| Philadelphia
| 3|| 0|| 3.0 || 1.000 || .000|| .000|| 1.0 || 0.0 || 0.0 || 0.0 || 2.0

College

References

External links
Dave Hoppen NBA statistics  @ NBA.com
Italian League stats
Nebraska Cornhuskers profile

1964 births
Living people
American expatriate basketball people in Italy
Atlanta Hawks draft picks
Basketball players from Nebraska
Basket Rimini Crabs players
Centers (basketball)
Charlotte Hornets expansion draft picks
Charlotte Hornets players
Fargo-Moorhead Fever players
Golden State Warriors players
Milwaukee Bucks players
Nebraska Cornhuskers men's basketball players
New Jersey Nets players
Philadelphia 76ers players
Rapid City Thrillers players
Sportspeople from Omaha, Nebraska
Topeka Sizzlers players
American men's basketball players
Universiade medalists in basketball
Universiade silver medalists for the United States